The discography of Japanese hip-hop group Lead includes 9 studio albums, 1 compilation album, 1 remix album, 16 live albums and 32 singles. Their first sixteen singles were released under the Pony Canyon sub-label Flight Master; since, their singles have been strictly under Pony Canyon. 

Lead debuted on July 31, 2002 with the single Manatsu no Magic. Their following single, Show Me the Way (2002), led to them winning the Best Newcomer Award during the 44th annual Japan Record Awards. Their debut studio album, Life On Da Beat, was released on April 23, 2003. 

Initially releasing one album a year since their debut (2003) up until Feel the Vibes (2008), the group began slowing their releases; however, they would continue to release an annual single and host their annual Upturn tour. Their next studio album, Now or Never, would not be released for another four years in 2012. This would also be their last album with leader and lead vocalist Hiroki Nakadoi. The single Still, released five months after Now or Never on December 12, 2012, would be their last single with Hiroki.

Beginning in 2012, the group would begin to release two singles a year. Their success on the Oricon Singles Charts would also increase, leading to a string of top five releases for the next five years - something that they had not experienced as a group prior. Their eighth studio album, The Showcase, became their highest charting album throughout their career, peaking at #2 on the Oricon Albums Charts. Their following studio album, Milestone, while charting lower than The Showcase, became their longest charting album, remaining on the charts for seven weeks.

Albums

Studio albums

Compilation albums

Remix albums

Singles

DVD/VHS

Solo DVD releases

Promotional videos

Life On Da Beat
Manatsu no Magic
Show Me the Way
Fly Away

Brand New Era
Funky Days!
Get Wild Life
Night Deluxe

Lead! Heat! Beat!
Tenohira wo Taiyou ni
Atarashii Kisetsu e
Baby Running Wild

Lead Tracks: Listener's Choice
Sunnyday

4
Virgin Blue
Summer Madness

Feel the Vibes
Drive Alive
Umi
Stand Up!

Now or Never
GiraGira Romantic
Speed Star
Hurricane
Wanna Be With You
Stand and Fight

The Showcase
Still
Upturn
Green Days
Sakura
Omoide Breaker
My One
Upturn -Dance Focused ver.-
Green Days -Shinya Tanuichi Solo Focused ver.-
Green Days -Keita Furuya Solo Focused ver.-
Green Days -Akira Yamaoka Solo Focused ver.-
Sakura -Dance ver.-
Omoide Breaker -Dance ver.-
My One -Dance ver.-
Yakusoku
Yakusoku -Dance ver.-
Zoom up
Zoom up -Dance ver.-

Milestone
Tokyo Fever
Tokyo Fever -Dance ver.-
Beautiful Day
Shampoo Bubble -Image Movie in Hawaii-
Bumblebee
Love or Love?
Backpack -Choreo Video-

Singularity
Be the Naked
Summer Vacation
Sunset Refrain
Hide and Seek

Lead the Best
Tuxedo
Kangoku Rokku
Sonic Boom

Participation works
Buddies (March 19, 2003)
"Fly Away" (Akira's Conquistador Remix)
"Show me the way" (TinyVoice, Production Remix)
CHRISTMAS HARMONY ~VISION FACTORY presents~ (November 21, 2007)
"Ding Dong"
"OkiDoki Christmas"
SPRING HARMONY ~VISION FACTORY presents~ (February 13, 2008)
"Thanks for..."
FLOWER FESTIVAL ~VISION FACTORY presents~ (March 19, 2008)
"Dear My Flower"
Heartbeat (December 25, 2019)
"Manatsu no Magic"
"Virgin Blue 2010"
Wormhole / GboySwag (November 18, 2019)
"Chao Zhan Kai" feat. Lead (Japanese ver.) (超展開 / Super Expansion)
20XX "We are" / w-inds. album (November 24, 2021)
"The Christmas Song" feat. Da Pump & Lead

Unreleased songs
Songs that did not garner an official release, but were performed at live venues.

"Arashi no Hibi" (嵐の日々 / Stormy Days) (August 18, 2004)
Kamachi tie-in song.
"Tribal Party" (November 17, 2004)
Lyrics: Lead / Composition & Arrangement: Hiroki Nakadoi
"LD Style" (December 7, 2005)
Lyrics: Lead / Composition: Hiroki Nakadoi & Hayabusa / Arrangement: Hayabusa
"Time to Jam", "356STEP" (December 6, 2006)
Composition: KATSU / Arrangement: e-catwork
"B.W.R", "Sweetest Taboo", "Red Eye Night", "Features" (December 12, 2007)
Arrangement: Mr FLAVOR (Need A Beat)

Films
Boutaoshi! (2003)
Shinya Tanuichi as Tsuguo Takayama
Akira Kagimoto as Atsushi Tabuchi
Keita Furuya as Suzumi Manabu
Hiroki Nakadoi as Toru Akasaka (Nakkan)
Deep Love (2004)
Keita Furuya as Yoshiyuki
Kamachi (2004)
Shinya Tanuichi as Kamachi Yamada
Keita Furuya as Sayama Yuichi
Akira Kagimoto as Himuro Kosuke
Hiroki Nakadoi as Shun Iijma
Oretachi no Ashita (2014)
Shinya Taniuchi as Tsuyoshi Kakinoki

Television
Deep Love ~Ayu no Monogatari~ (October - December 2004)
Keita Furuya as Yoshiyuki
Pink no Idenshi (October 3 - December 2005)
Hiroki Nakadoi as Taichi Kobayashi
Shinsengumi PEACE MAKER (January 2010-present)
Shinya Tanuichi as Toshizou Hijikata
Konya wa Kokoro Dake Daite (March - April 2014)
Shinya Tanuichi as Hashii Shougo

References

External links
Lead Official Site

Discographies of Japanese artists
Hip hop discographies